= Trebolares =

Coordinates: 35°35′S 63°35′W

- Rural locality and village
- Interactive map of Trebolares
- Country: Argentina
- Province: La Pampa Province
- Time zone: UTC−3 (ART)

Trebolares is a village and rural locality (municipality) in La Pampa Province in Argentina.
